Redwood Village is a neighborhood of the Mid-City region of San Diego, California. Formerly known as Darnall, on June 7, 2007, residents voted to change the name of the neighborhood to Redwood Village. Redwood Village is a mostly residential neighborhood, with the exception of the area South of University avenue which is home to the University Square Shopping Center.

Geography
Redwood Village's borders are defined by 54th street to the West, University Avenue to the North, College Avenue to the East, and Streamview Drive to the South.

Education
Redwood Village hosts an elementary schools.
Darnall E-Campus Charter Elementary School (San Diego Unified School District)

References

External links 
Redwood Village Website
San Diego City Council District 7

Neighborhoods in San Diego